Dettelbach Bahnhof is a railway station in the municipality of Dettelbach, located in the Kitzingen district in Bavaria, Germany.

References

Railway stations in Bavaria
Buildings and structures in Kitzingen (district)